Binnur Kaya (born 19 April 1972) is a Turkish actress.

Biography
Kaya graduated in theatre from Bilkent University in 1995. She went to Istanbul where she worked at the Ankara Sahnesi and Karatahta Child Theatres and then at the Bakırköy Municipal Theatre.
Through a friend she met at the Bakırköy Municipal Theatre, she made her television debut as Asiye on the Hülya Avşar Show. She joined the BKM theatre troupe and appeared with them in such as Bir Demet Tiyatro, Bekarlar ve Bana Bir Şeyhler Oluyor.  

Later, she appeared in the series Dış Kapının Mandalları directed by her close friend Engin Günaydın in 1998 and then in other popular series like Çarli, Yabancı Damat, 7 Numara, Kaynanalar and Baba Evi. She played numerous roles in Bir Demet Tiyatro. In 2003, she appeared in the film İnşaat directed by Ömer Vargı. Then she acted in the films Babam ve Oğlum, Abuzer Kadayıf, Küçük Kıyamet and Hayatımın Kadınısın.

Between 2007 and 2008, she played two roles as Dilber and Şahika Koçarslanlı in the hit sitcom Avrupa Yakası. 

Kaya received a lot of acclaim for her role in the 2009 film Vavien'', winning several awards including the SİYAD award for Best Actress and the Yeşilçam award for Best Actress.

Filmography

References

External links
 

1972 births
Living people
People from Ankara
Turkish film actresses
Turkish stage actresses
Turkish television actresses
Bilkent University alumni
20th-century Turkish actresses